China competed at the 2018 Winter Paralympics in PyeongChang, Korea, held between 9–18 March 2018. With Beijing being the host of the 2022 Winter Paralympics, a Chinese segment was performed at the closing ceremony. China won 1 medal in total.

On 17 March, Wang Haitao, Chen Jianxin, Liu Wei, Wang Meng and Zhang Qiang won the first Winter Paralympics medal for China with gold in wheelchair curling.

Medalists 

| width="78%" align="left" valign="top" |

Competitors 
The following is the list of number of competitors participating at the Games per sport/discipline.

Alpine skiing 
China qualified one female alpine skier.
Women

Biathlon 
China qualified two female and three male biathletes.
Men

Women

Cross-country skiing 
China qualified twelve male and four female cross-country skiers.
Men

Women

Snowboarding 

Slalom

Snowboard cross

Wheelchair curling 

Summary

Round-robin
China has a bye in draws 1, 3, 8, 11, 13 and 15.

Draw 2
Saturday, 10 March, 19:35

Draw 4
Sunday, 11 March, 14:35

Draw 5
Sunday, 11 March, 19:35

Draw 6
Monday, 12 March, 09:35

Draw 7
Monday, 12 March, 14:35

Draw 9
Tuesday, 13 March, 09:35

Draw 10
Tuesday, 13 March, 14:35

Draw 12
Wednesday, 14 March, 9:35

Draw 14
Wednesday, 14 March, 19:35

Draw 16
Thursday, 15 March, 14:35

Draw 17
Thursday, 15 March, 19:35

Semifinal
Friday, 16 March, 15:35

Final
Saturday, 17 March, 14:35

See also 
 China at the 2018 Winter Olympics

External links
 PyeongChang Official website 
International Paralympic Committee PyeongChang website

Nations at the 2018 Winter Paralympics
2018
Paralympics